Tropidtamba is a genus of moths of the family Erebidae. The genus was erected by George Hampson in 1926.

Species
Tropidtamba grisea (Holland, 1900) Buru, Malaysia
Tropidtamba lepraota (Hampson, 1898) Assam, Khasis, Singapore, Queensland

References

Calpinae
Noctuoidea genera